was the second of the fifty-three stations of the Tōkaidō. It is located in Kawasaki-ku in the present-day city of Kawasaki, Kanagawa Prefecture, Japan.

History
Kawasaki-juku was established as a post station in 1623, by the local magistrate Hasegawa Nagatsuna. It was the last post station to be built along the Tōkaidō. It was located near Heiken-ji, a famous Buddhist temple, so it was often used by travelers coming to pray.

The classic ukiyo-e print by Andō Hiroshige (Hōeidō edition) from 1831–1834 depicts travelers in a ferry-boat crossing the Tama River, and passengers waiting on the further bank. Mount Fuji is depicted in the far distance.

Neighboring post towns
Tōkaidō
Shinagawa-juku - Kawasaki-juku - Kanagawa-juku

References

Carey, Patrick. Rediscovering the Old Tokaido:In the Footsteps of Hiroshige. Global Books UK (2000). 
Chiba, Reiko. Hiroshige's Tokaido in Prints and Poetry. Tuttle. (1982) 
Taganau, Jilly. The Tokaido Road: Travelling and Representation in Edo and Meiji Japan. RoutledgeCurzon (2004). 

Stations of the Tōkaidō
Stations of the Tōkaidō in Kanagawa Prefecture